José de Avelar Rebelo  (c.1600–1657) was a Portuguese painter of about the middle of the 17th century. He was appointed Royal Painter to the King Dom João IV of Portugal.

References

 

Portuguese painters
Portuguese male painters
Baroque painters
17th-century Portuguese people
1657 deaths
1600s births
People from Lisbon 

Portugal painter stub